Chris Smith may refer to:

Arts and entertainment

Music 
Chris Smith (composer) (1879–1949), American composer and performer
Chris "Frenchie" Smith, American record producer and musician
Chris "Daddy Mac" Smith, member of rap music duo Kris Kross
Chris Smith, lead guitarist/vocalist in the band Keelhaul
Chris Smith, vocalist in Mythology
Chris Smith, touring drums in Short Stack
Chris Smith, keyboardist in Jefferson Starship
Chris Smith, drummer and producer, member of The Internet

Other media
Chris Smith (broadcaster), Australian talkback radio broadcaster and radio host
Chris Smith (filmmaker) (born 1970), American filmmaker
Chris Smith (newsreader), British radio journalist
Chris Smith (EastEnders), fictional soap opera character

Politics 
Chris Smith (New Jersey politician) (born 1953), U.S. Representative from New Jersey
Chris Smith (Florida politician) (born 1970), Florida state senator
Chris Smith, Baron Smith of Finsbury (born 1951), former British Member of Parliament and government minister

Sports

Association football
Chris Smith (footballer, born 1981), English footballer
Chris Smith (footballer, born 1986), Scottish footballer
Chris Smith (footballer, born 1988), Scottish footballer
Chris Smith (footballer, born 1990), English footballer
Chris Smith (footballer, born 1998), English footballer

Baseball
Chris Smith (first baseman) (born 1957), American baseball player
Chris Smith (pitcher, born 1981), American baseball player
Chris Smith (pitcher, born 1988), American baseball player

Basketball
Chris Smith (basketball, born 1939), American college basketball player at Virginia Tech
Chris Smith (basketball, born 1970), American basketball player in the 1990s
Chris Smith (basketball, born 1987), American basketball player, attended Manhattan and Louisville
Chris Smith (basketball, born 1999), American basketball player, attended UCLA

Gridiron football
Chris Smith (defensive back) (born 1987), American football player
Chris Smith (defensive end) (born 1992), American football player
Chris Smith (running back, born 1963), American football player
Chris Smith (running back, born 1999), American football player
Chris Smith (safety) (born 1985), American football safety in the Canadian Football League
Chris Smith (tight end) (born 1966), American football player

Rugby
Chris Smith (rugby league, born 1975), Welsh rugby league footballer
Chris Smith (rugby league, born 1994), Australian rugby league footballer
Chris Smith (rugby union) (born 1994), South African rugby union player

Other sports
Chris Billam-Smith (born 1990), British boxer
Chris Smith (Australian footballer) (born 1955), Australian rules footballer for Fitzroy
Chris Smith (Australian footballer, born 1988), Australian rules footballer from Queensland, drafted by Fremantle
Chris Smith (cricketer, born 1958) (born 1958), English cricketer
Chris Smith (cricketer, born 1973), Australian-born former Dutch cricketer
Chris Smith (racing driver) (born 1966), race car driver, 1992 Atlantic Series Champion
Chris Smith (golfer) (born 1969), American PGA Tour golfer

Others 
Chris Smith (science communicator) (born 1975), medical doctor and radio broadcaster on the BBC
Chris Smith (biologist), professor of biology
Chris Smith (priest) (born 1963), archdeacon of Morgannwg
Chris Smith (American academic) (born 1958), American legal academic
Christopher Arthur Smith (1892–1952), known as Chris (A.), South Australian architect

See also
Christopher Smith (disambiguation)
Christian Smith (disambiguation)
Christine Smith (disambiguation)
Christina Smith (disambiguation)